Kristofer McNeeley (born September 24, 1974, in Oklahoma City, Oklahoma) is an American stage, film and television actor and producer.

McNeeley's television credits include Birds of Prey, That's Life, Days of Our Lives, and Neurotic Tendencies.  Stage includes Jersey Boys (Las Vegas Company & the San Francisco holiday return engagement cast) and James Joyce's The Dead.

He currently resides in Vancouver, British Columbia.

External links

Kristofer McNeeley on Myspace

1974 births
American male stage actors
American male film actors
American male television actors
Living people